Miara is a rural town and coastal locality in the Bundaberg Region, Queensland, Australia.

Geography
Yandaran Creek forms the south-eastern boundary, and the Coral Sea the north-eastern.

History 
The town's name is believed to be an Aboriginal word from the Kabi term meaning wild woman.

The town site was surveyed in 1884.

Education 
There are no schools in Miara. The nearest government primary school is Yandaran State School in neighbouring Yandaran to the south-west. The nearest government secondary school in Rosedale State High School in Rosedale to the west.

Amenities 
There is a boat ramp on the north bank of Kolan River. It is managed by the Bundaberg Regional Council.

References

External links 

 

Towns in Queensland
Bundaberg Region
Coastline of Queensland
Localities in Queensland